The 1980 United States Senate election in Idaho took place on November 4, 1980 alongside other elections to the United States Senate in other states as well as elections to the United States House of Representatives and various state and local elections. Incumbent Democratic U.S. Senator Frank Church ran for re-election to a fifth term, but was narrowly defeated by Republican Steve Symms.

Major candidates

Democratic 
 Frank Church, incumbent U.S. Senator

Republican 
 Steve Symms, U.S. Congressman

Results

See also 
 1980 United States Senate elections

References 

1980 Idaho elections
Idaho
1980